Mama(s) or Mamma or Momma may refer to:

Roles
Mother, a female parent
Mama-san, in Japan and East Asia, a woman in a position of authority
Mamas, a name for female associates of the Hells Angels

Places
Mama, Russia, an urban-type settlement in Mamsko-Chuysky District of Irkutsk Oblast, Russia
Mama Airport, an airport there
Mama (river), a tributary of the Vitim in Irkutsk Oblast, Russia
Mama Municipality, Yucatán, a municipality of Yucatán
Mama, Yucatán, the municipal seat of the Mama Municipality, Yucatán

Anatomy
The breast, the upper ventral region of a mammal's torso; see:
Mamma (anatomy) of humans
Mammary gland of female mammals
Udder of female quadruped mammals

Art, entertainment, and media

People and fictional characters
Big Bad Mama, stage name of Lynn Braxton, professional wrestler from the Gorgeous Ladies of Wrestling
Big Mama, former manager of American professional wrestler Jimmy Valiant (born 1942)
Gemma Teller Morrow, a character on The Sons of Anarchy television show, called "Mama" by her lover Nero Padilla
Mama Maybelle Harper, a character in the American TV sitcom Gimme a Break!
Mamas K. Chandran (born 1981), Indian film director, known professionally as Mamas
Mama Threadgoode, a character in the 1991 American comedy-drama movie Fried Green Tomatoes
Momma Lift, a character in the 1987 movie Throw Momma from the Train
Shylo Malsawmtluanga, an Indian footballer nicknamed Mama
Thelma Harper or "Mama", a fictional character on The Carol Burnett Show and the sitcom Mama's Family

Film and television 
Ma-ma (1976 film), a Soviet–French–Romanian musical film directed by Elisabeta Bostan
Mamma (1982 film), a Swedish film directed by Suzanne Osten
Mama (1990 film), a Chinese film directed by Zhang Yuan
 "Mama", a 1985 episode of the TV sitcom Gimme a Break!
Mamá (2008 film), an Argentine short film directed by Andres Muschietti
Mama (2013 film), a Spanish-Canadian-Mexican supernatural horror directed by Andres Muschietti
Ma Ma (2015 film), a Spanish film directed by Julio Medem
Mama (American TV series), a 1949–1957 American comedy–drama series
Mama (South Korean TV series), a 2014 South Korean television series

Literature
Mamma (1908), a novel by Rhoda Broughton
"Mama", a short story by Dorothy Allison in the collection Trash: Short Stories (1988)
Mama: Love, Motherhood and Revolution, a 2015 anthology by Antonella Gambotto-Burke
Momma, a syndicated comic strip

Music

Bands
Momma (band), an American indie rock band from Los Angeles, California formed in 2018

Albums
Mama (Brenda Fassie album) or the title song, 1994
Mama (Nomeansno album), 1982
Mama (Vitas album), or the title song, 2003
Mama (EP) or the title song (see below), by EXO-K and EXO-M, 2012
Mama, an EP by Adrian Eagle, 2019

Songs
"Mama" (6ix9ine song), 2018
"Mama" (B. J. Thomas song), 1966
"Mama" (Clean Bandit song), 2019
"Mama" (Exo song), 2012
"Mama" (Genesis song), 1983
"Mama" (Jonas Blue song), 2017
"Mama" (Spice Girls song), 1997
"Mama" (Umberto Tozzi and Laura Branigan song), 1983
"Mama" (Vladimir Arzumanyan song), Armenia entry in the Junior Eurovision Song Contest 2010
"Mama (Ana Ahabak)", by Christina Stürmer, 2003
"Mama (Loves a Crackhead)", by Plan B, 2006
"Mamas" (song), by Anne Wilson and Hillary Scott, 2022
"Mamma" (song), a 1940 Italian song composed by Cesare Andrea Bixio and Bixio Cherubini; covered in English by David Whitfield (1955), Connie Francis (1960), and others
"Mama", by Alabama Shakes from Boys & Girls, 2012
"Mama", by Ant Wan, 2019
"Mama", by Beth Hart from Screamin' for My Supper, 1999
"Mama", by Brymo from Oṣó, 2018
"Mama", by BTS from Wings, 2016
"Mama", by Chris Brown from Exclusive, 2007
"Mama", by Electric Light Orchestra from ELO 2, 1973
"Mama", by Ella Eyre and Banx & Ranx, 2019
"Mama", by Godsmack from IV, 2006
"Mama", by Helen Reddy from Music, Music, 1976
"Mama", by Il Divo from Il Divo, 2004
"Mama", by The Kelly Family, 1999
"Mama", by Kim Appleby from Kim Appleby, 1990
"Mama", by The Lonely Island from Turtleneck & Chain, 2011
"Mama", by Lyfe Jennings from I Still Believe, 2010
"MAMA", by MadClip (1987-2021) Greek-American rapper
"Mama", by My Chemical Romance from The Black Parade, 2006
"Mama", by Oingo Boingo from Boi-ngo, 1986
"Mama", by The Sugarcubes from Life's Too Good, 1988
"Mama", by The-Dream from Love Hate, 2007
"Mamá", by Timbiriche from La Banda Timbiriche, 1982
"Mama", by Toto from Hydra, 1979
"Mama", by Trina from The One, 2019
"Mama", by Yemi Alade from Mama Africa, 2016

Other music
MAMA Records, an American record label
Mnet Asian Music Awards, an annual South Korean music awards show
MTV Africa Music Awards, a continental music awards show

Other entertainment
Mama (magazine), a Swedish magazine
Mama (1966), a stage musical by Mbongeni Ngema

Brands and enterprises
MAMA & Company, a UK live-venue and event management company
MAMA Gallery, an art gallery in Los Angeles, California
MAMMA (association), Modernist Architects of Morocco Memorial Association
Murray Art Museum Albury, New South Wales, Australia
Massachusetts Academy of Math and Science at WPI (MAMAS)
Mama, a brand of instant noodles by Thai President Foods

Computing and technology
Mama (software), an object-oriented programming language
Mamma.com, a metasearch engine operated by Copernic

Religion and mythology
Mammes of Caesarea or Mammas (259–275), semi-legendary child-martyr of the 3rd century
Mami (goddess) or Mama, a goddess in the Babylonian epic Atra-Hasis
Ninhursag or Mamma, a Sumerian earth goddess

Other uses
Mama (wasp), a genus of wasps in the tribe Euphorini
Mama and papa, in linguistics, the sequences of sounds corresponding to the words for "mother" and "father"
Mama or sugar mama, a term for an age disparity in sexual relationships in which the older partner takes care of the younger, usually financially

See also
Baby mama (disambiguation)
Big Bad Mamma, a track from the soundtrack to the 1997 film, How to Be a Player
La Mama (disambiguation)
Lil Mama (born 1989), American hip hop recording artist 
Ma (disambiguation)
Ma-Mha, a 2007 Thai film
Mame (disambiguation)
Mami (disambiguation)
Mamma mia (disambiguation)
Mammatus cloud
Mamo (song), by Anastasia Prikhodko, Russia's 2009 Eurovision entry
Maternal insult or "yo mama joke"
Mom (disambiguation)
Mommy (disambiguation)
Mother (disambiguation)
Suga Mama (disambiguation)